The Transportation Research Board (TRB) is a division of the National Academy of Sciences, Engineering, and Medicine, formerly the National Research Council of the United States, which serves as an independent adviser to the President of the United States, the Congress and federal agencies on scientific and technical questions of national importance. It is jointly administered by the National Academy of Sciences, the National Academy of Engineering, and the National Academy of Medicine.

As one of seven major divisions of the National Academies of Sciences, Engineering, and Medicine, TRB promotes innovation and progress in transportation through research in an objective and interdisciplinary setting. It provides trusted, timely, impartial, and evidence-based information exchange, research, and advice regarding all modes of transportation. TRB hosts some 200 standing technical committees that address specific aspects of transport and the TRB Annual Meeting attracts thousands of transportation professionals.

History
The Transportation Research Board was established in 1920 as the "National Advisory Board on Highway Research" and changed its name to the "Highway Research Board" from 1925 until 1974, when it was renamed again as the "Transportation Research Board." Initially being solely involved in the sharing of information, it has commissioned ad-hoc research since 1950, became more involved in multi-modal transport in the 1960s, and has extended its operations further more recently.

Activities and organization
TRB fulfills this mission through the work of its more than 200 standing committees and task forces addressing all modes and aspects of transportation; publication and dissemination of reports and peer-reviewed technical papers on research findings; management of cooperative research and other research programs; conduct of special studies on transportation policy issues at the request of the U.S. Congress and government agencies; operation of an online computerized file of transportation research information; and the hosting of the TRB Annual Meeting each January in Washington DC that, in 2020, attracted more than 14,000 transportation professionals from throughout the United States and abroad. 

TRB's activities are organized as follows:

 Division A – Technical Activities
 Division B – Studies and Special Programs
 Division C – Administration and Finance
 Division D – Cooperative Research Programs

TRB's varied activities annually draw on over 7,000 engineers, planners, scientists, and other transportation researchers from the public and private sectors and academia, who contribute expertise in the public interest by participating on TRB committees, panels, and task forces. The program is supported by state transportation departments, the various administrations of the U.S. Department of Transportation and other federal agencies, industry associations, and other organizations and individuals interested in the development of transportation.

Publications and databases
Publications include the Highway Capacity Manual, the Transportation Research Record journal, and a bi-monthly magazine called TR News. A history of transportation research and of TRB was published in January 2020 called The Transportation Research Board, 1920–2020: Everyone Interested Is Invited. Transportation Research Information Services (TRIS) offers several databases for researchers:

The TRID Database is an integrated database that combines the records from TRB's Transportation Research Information Services (TRIS) Database and the OECD's Joint Transport Research Centre’s International Transport Research Documentation (ITRD) Database. TRID is the world's largest and most comprehensive bibliographic resource on transportation research information. It contains more than one million records of published and ongoing research, covering all modes and disciplines of transportation. More than 156,000 records contain links to full-text documents. The records in TRID are indexed with a standardized vocabulary from the Transportation Research Thesaurus (TRT) or the ITRD Thesaurus, depending on the source organization.
The Research in Progress (RiP) Database contains more than 12,400 current or recently completed transportation research projects, mostly those funded by the modal administrations of the U.S. Department of Transportation, state Departments of Transportation (DOTs), University Transportation Centers, or by TRB's cooperative research programs.
Research Needs Statements (RNS) Database An important function of TRB is to stimulate research that addresses issues facing the transportation community. In support of this function, TRB Technical Activities standing committees identify, develop, and disseminate research need statements (RNS) for use by practitioners, researchers, and others.
The TRB Publications Index (Pubsindex) contains bibliographic information on almost 48,000 papers, articles, and reports published by the Highway Research Board, Transportation Research Board, Strategic Highway Research Program, and the Marine Board.
The Practice Ready Papers (PRP) Database] contains papers that are defined as those in which the research results presented and discussed make a contribution to the solution of current or future problems or issues for practitioners. Information presented in these papers is ready for immediate implementation or requires minimal additional research or implementation effort.

Funding opportunities 
TRB offers selective research funding notably, the National Cooperative Highway Research Program (NCHRP), the Airport Cooperative Research Program (ACRP), and the Transit Cooperative Research Program (TCRP). Each one of these programs has industry leaders who act as references while completing the project.

See also 
 National Cooperative Highway Research Program
 World Conference on Transport Research Society
 Transportation safety in the United States

References 

Transportation organizations based in the United States
Research councils
Transport research organizations